The 2000 Swisscom Challenge was a women's tennis tournament played on indoor carpet courts. It was the 17th edition of the event and was part of the Tier I Series of the 2000 WTA Tour. It took place at the Schluefweg in Zürich, Switzerland, from 8 through 15 October 2000. Martina Hingis won the singles title.

Points and prize money

Point distribution

Prize money

* per team

Singles main draw entrants

Seeds

1 Rankings as of 2 October 2000.

Other entrants
The following players received wildcards into the singles main draw:
  Emmanuelle Gagliardi
  Lina Krasnoroutskaya
  Magdalena Maleeva

The following players received entry from the qualifying draw:
  Andrea Glass
  Jana Kandarr
  Anastasia Myskina
  Tatiana Panova

Doubles main draw entrants

Seeds

1 Rankings as of 2 October 2000.

Other entrants

The following pair received a wildcard into the doubles main draw:
  Lina Krasnoroutskaya /  Anastasia Myskina

The following pair received entry from the qualifying draw:
  Andrea Glass /  Bianka Lamade

Finals

Singles

  Martina Hingis defeated  Lindsay Davenport, 6–4, 4–6, 7–5.
It was the 7th title in the season for Hingis and the 33rd title in her singles career.

Doubles

  Martina Hingis /  Anna Kournikova defeated  Kimberly Po /  Anne-Gaëlle Sidot, 6–3, 6–4.
It was the 31st title for Hingis and the 10th title for Kournikova in their respective careers.

References

External links
  Official results archive (ITF)
 Official results archive (WTA)

Swisscom Challenge
2000
2000 in Swiss tennis
2000 in Swiss women's sport